Civic Center is a neighborhood in Houston. It is located on the northwest part of Downtown, north of the Skyline District and southwest of Theater District. It is notable for being the home to the Houston City Hall, City Hall Annex, Hermann Square, Bob Casey United States Court House, Sam Houston Park, and both the Jesse. H. Jones Building and Julia Ideson Building of the Houston Public Library.

Location
The Civic Center is located in the northeastern part of Downtown. It borders the Skyline District to the South and the Theater District to the northeast.

Neighborhoods in Houston